This is a list of diplomatic missions of the Dominican Republic, excluding honorary consulates. Most of the Dominican Republic's missions are located in the Americas and the Caribbean.

Africa

 Cairo (Embassy)

 Rabat (Embassy)

 Pretoria (Embassy)

Americas

St. John's (Embassy)

 Buenos Aires (Embassy)

 La Paz (Embassy)

 Brasília (Embassy)
 Rio de Janeiro (Consulate-General)
 São Paulo (Consulate-General)

 Ottawa (Embassy)
 Montreal (Consulate-General)
 Toronto (Consulate-General)

 Santiago (Embassy)

 Bogotá (Embassy)

 San José (Embassy)

 Havana (Embassy)

 Quito (Embassy)

 San Salvador (Embassy)

 Guatemala City (Embassy)

 Port-au-Prince (Embassy)
 Anse-à-Pitres (Consulate-General)
 Ouanaminthe (Consulate-General)
 Belladère (Consulate)

 Tegucigalpa (Embassy)

 Kingston (Embassy)

 Mexico City (Embassy)

 Managua (Embassy)

 Panama City (Embassy)

 Asuncion (Embassy)

 Lima (Embassy)

 Port of Spain (Embassy)

 Washington, D.C. (Embassy)
 Boston (Consulate-General)
 Chicago (Consulate-General)
 Los Angeles (Consulate-General)
 Miami (Consulate-General)
 New Orleans (Consulate-General)
 New York (Consulate-General)
 San Juan, Puerto Rico (Consulate-General)
 Mayagüez, Puerto Rico (Consulate-General)

 Montevideo (Embassy)

 Caracas (Embassy)

Asia

 Beijing (Embassy)
 Hong Kong (Consulate-General)

 New Delhi (Embassy)

 Tel Aviv (Embassy)

 Tokyo (Embassy)

 Doha (Embassy)

 Seoul (Embassy)

 Ankara (Embassy)

 Abu Dhabi (Embassy)

 Hanoi (Embassy)

Europe

Vienna (Embassy)

 Brussels (Embassy)
 Antwerp (Consulate-General)

 Paris (Embassy)
 Marseilles (Consulate-General)
 Pointe-à-Pitre (Consulate-General)

 Berlin (Embassy)
 Hamburg (Consulate-General)

 Athens (Consulate-General)

 Rome (Embassy)

 Rome (Embassy)
 Genoa (Consulate-General)
 Milan (Consulate-General)

 The Hague (Embassy)
 Amsterdam (Consulate-General)
 Willemstad, Curaçao (Consulate-General)
 Philipsburg, Sint Maarten (Consulate-General)

 Lisbon (Embassy)

 Moscow (Embassy)

 Madrid (Embassy)
 Barcelona (Consulate-General)
 Santa Cruz de Tenerife (Consulate-General)
 Seville (Consulate)
 Valencia (Consulate)

 Stockholm (Embassy)

 Bern (Embassy)
 Zürich (Consulate-General)

 London (Embassy)

Multilateral organizations
 Brussels (Mission to the European Union)
 Geneva (Permanent Mission to the United Nations and international organizations)
 New York (Permanent Mission to the United Nations)
 Paris (Permanent Mission to UNESCO)
 Rome (Permanent Mission to Food and Agriculture Organization of the United Nations)
 Vienna (Permanent Mission to the United Nations)
 Washington, D.C. (Permanent Mission to the Organization of American States)

Gallery

Future missions to open
Below is a list of countries where the government of the Dominican Republic has stated its intentions to open diplomatic missions:
 
 Beirut (Embassy)

See also

 Foreign relations of the Dominican Republic

Notes

References

Ministry of Foreign Affairs of the Dominican Republic (in Spanish)

Diplomatic missions
Dominican Republic